Chiusaforte is a comune (municipality) in the Province of Udine in the Italian region Friuli-Venezia Giulia.

Geography

Chiusaforte is situated in the Canal del Ferro valley of the Fella River, running between the Carnic and Julian Alps to its confluence with the Tagliamento.

Chiusaforte borders the following municipalities: Dogna, Malborghetto Valbruna, Moggio Udinese, Bovec (Slovenia), Resia, Resiutta, Tarvisio.

The Fella Valley is the site of Pontebbana railway line from Udine to Tarvisio and the Austrian border. It is also traversed by the parallel Italian Autostrada A23 highway from Palmanova to Tarvisio.

History

The narrow valley  probably had been the site of a Roman Road from Italy to the Noricum province. Ulric von Eppenstein, Patriarch of Aquileia (1086–1121) had a fortress erected to charge tolls to travellers crossing the Alps. The Patriarchs had to defend their territory against the claims raised by the Counts of Görz and the Dukes of Carinthia, until in 1420 the Republic of Venice conquered the Fella Valley up to Pontebba and incorporated it into the Domini di Terraferma.

Annexed by the Habsburg monarchy according to the 1797 Treaty of Campo Formio it was part of the Austrian Kingdom of Lombardy–Venetia from 1815, until it fell with Venetia to the newly established Kingdom of Italy according to the 1866 Treaty of Vienna.

References

External links

Official website

Cities and towns in Friuli-Venezia Giulia